Loman may refer to:

People and fictional characters
Loman (surname), including a list of people and characters with the surname
 Lommán of Trim (fl. 5th—early 6th century), also known as Saint Loman, Irish bishop and saint

Places
 Loman, Jaghori, a village in Jaghori, Afghanistan
 , a village in Alba County, Romania
 Loman, Minnesota, United States, an unincorporated community
 Loman Branch, a minor tributary of the Cacapon River, West Virginia, United States

See also 
 Lohman (disambiguation)
 Lowman (disambiguation)
 Luman (disambiguation)